The 1913 Detroit Tigers football team  was an American football team that represented the University of Detroit in the 1913 college football season. In its first season under head coach George M. Lawton, the team compiled a 5–3–1 record and outscored its opponents by a combined total of 166 to 85.

Schedule

References

Detroit
Detroit Titans football seasons
Detroit Tigers football
Detroit Tigers football